The Lake Adair–Lake Concord Historic District is a U.S. historic district located to the east of Spring Lake including Overbrook Park and to the west of the Lake Adair and Lake Concord in Orlando, Florida. The district located in College Park is roughly bounded by Golfview Street, Edgewater Court, Alameda Street, and Peachtree Road.

It was added to the National Register of Historic Places on December 30, 2011.

References

National Register of Historic Places in Orange County, Florida
Historic districts on the National Register of Historic Places in Florida
Geography of Orlando, Florida